The Hamoaze is an estuarine stretch of the tidal River Tamar, between its confluence with the River Lynher and Plymouth Sound, England.

The name first appears as ryver of Hamose in 1588 and it originally most likely applied just to a creek of the estuary that led up to the manor of Ham, north of the present-day Devonport Dockyard. The name evidently later came to be used for the estuary's main channel. The ose element possibly derives from Old English  meaning 'mud' (as in 'ooze') – the creek consisting of mud-banks at low tide.

The Hamoaze flows past Devonport Dockyard, which is one of three major bases of the Royal Navy today. The presence of large numbers of small watercraft is a challenge and hazard to the warships using the naval base and dockyard. Navigation on the waterway is controlled by the King's Harbour Master for Plymouth.

Settlements on the banks of the Hamoaze are Saltash, Wilcove, Torpoint and Cremyll in Cornwall, as well as Devonport and Plymouth in Devon.

Two regular ferry services crossing the Hamoaze exist: the Torpoint Ferry (a chain ferry that takes vehicles) and the Cremyll Ferry (passengers and cyclists only).

The Hamoaze has a street in Torpoint named after it.

See also
Tamar-Tavy Estuary

References

Geography of Plymouth, Devon
Estuaries of England
Transport in Plymouth, Devon
Rivers of Cornwall
River Tamar